Ninety-Six District (not "96th") is a former judicial district in the U.S. state of South Carolina. It existed as a district from 29 July 1769 to 31 December 1799. The court house and jail for Ninety-Six District were in Ninety Six, South Carolina.

Colonial period
In the colonial period, the land around the coast was divided into parishes corresponding to the parishes of the Church of England. There were also several counties that had judicial and electoral functions. As people settled the backcountry, judicial districts and additional counties were organized. This structure continued and grew after the Revolutionary War. In 1798, all counties were re-identified as "elective districts" to be effective on 1 January 1800. In 1868, the districts were converted back to counties. The South Carolina Department of Archives and History has maps that show the boundaries of counties, districts, and parishes starting in 1682.

Ninety-Six District was created on 29 July 1769, as the most western of the seven original districts within the Province of South Carolina. Its boundaries included the current Abbeville, McCormick, Edgefield, Saluda, Greenwood, Laurens, Union, and Spartanburg counties; much of Cherokee and Newberry counties; and small parts of Aiken and Greenville counties. 

The lands further west and on the other side of the Appalachian Mountains were still Cherokee homelands, which the British Crown had tried to protect from colonial encroachment by the Royal Proclamation of 1763. They continued to allow traders or travelers in the area. The westward expansion of the borders of the Province of North Carolina and the Colony of Virginia (then including present-day Kentucky) were confirmed by the 1770 Treaty of Lochaber with the Cherokee. Some 1000 Cherokee were hosted by Alexander Cameron at Lochabar Plantation in the Ninety-Six District. Due to poor surveying, Tryon County, North Carolina infringed on much of its northern boundaries through the 1770s.

The judicial capital town was Ninety Six, South Carolina; located at

Divisions
As a result of the 1785 Act, districts in South Carolina were further subdivided into counties.  These counties were responsible for maintaining court houses, as part of the larger judicial districts from which they were formed.  The Ninety-Six District was given the counties of Abbeville, Edgefield, Laurens, Newberry, Spartanburg, and Union.

On 19 February 1791, the Ninety-Six District lost the land in the current Union, Spartanburg counties and the portion of Cherokee county within the district in the formation of Pinckney District.

Disestablishment
On 1 January 1800, Ninety-Six District was abolished and replaced by the Abbeville, Edgefield, Greenville, Laurens, and Newberry Districts.

Notable inhabitants
James Augustus Black, (1793–1848), United States Congressman from South Carolina.
Bloody Bill Cunningham, (Major William Cunningham) (1756 –1787), was an officer in the Loyalist Militia who conducted a bloody campaign in Ninety-Six District in the fall of 1781.

Present day
The Old 96 District Tourism Commission was formed to promote tourism in five of the counties that were formed from the original district - Abbeville, Edgefield, Greenwood, Laurens, and McCormick.

See also
 Ninety Six National Historic Site
 Siege of Ninety-Six

References

External links
 The Formation of Counties in South Carolina, South Carolina Department of Archives and History
 Maps Tracing the Formation of Counties in South Carolina, South Carolina Department of Archives and History
 Official tourism site of the Old 96 District

Former counties, districts, and parishes of South Carolina
Regions of South Carolina
Abbeville County, South Carolina
Aiken County, South Carolina
Cherokee County, South Carolina
Edgefield County, South Carolina
Greenville County, South Carolina
Greenwood County, South Carolina
Laurens County, South Carolina
McCormick County, South Carolina
Newberry County, South Carolina
Saluda County, South Carolina
Spartanburg County, South Carolina
Union County, South Carolina